The Beysehir nase (Chondrostoma beysehirense) is a species of ray-finned fish in the family Cyprinidae.
It is found only in Turkey and it is restricted to three streams flowing into Lake Beysehir, where it also occurs, in central Anatolia.

References

External links

Chondrostoma
Endemic fauna of Turkey
Fish described in 1997
Taxonomy articles created by Polbot